Lorneville may refer to:

Lorneville, New Zealand
Lorneville, Nova Scotia
 Lorneville, Ontario